Eight vessels of the Royal Navy have been named HMS Triton or HMS Tryton, after Triton, the son of Poseidon and Amphitrite, and the personification of the roaring waters:

  was a 42-gun fifth rate, originally the French ship Triton, captured by the British in 1702 at the Battle of Vigo Bay, and sold in 1709.
  was a sloop in commission in 1741.
  was a 24-gun sixth-rate frigate launched in 1745 and burned on 28 April 1758 to avoid capture by the French.
  was a 28-gun sixth-rate frigate launched in 1773. She served with Rear Admiral Sir Samuel Hood's fleet off Nevis on 25 January 1782. She was broken up in 1796.
  was a 32-gun fifth-rate frigate launched in 1796. She served in the French Revolutionary and Napoleonic Wars and was broken up in 1820.
  was an iron paddle sloop launched in 1846 and sold in 1872.
  was a paddle survey vessel launched in 1882. She was a school ship at Gravesend from 1919, and was broken up in 1961.
  was a T-class submarine launched in 1937 and sunk in 1940.

See also
  was a 28-gun sixth rate, formerly the French privateer Royal.
  was an experimental trimaran operated by the Royal Navy in the early 2000s before being sold to the Maritime and Coastguard Agency in 2005 as a survey vessel. She was not commissioned however and did not carry the HMS prefix.

References
 

Royal Navy ship names